Little Pelican is a suburb of the City of Lake Macquarie in New South Wales, Australia, located  south of Newcastle's central business district across the entrance to Lake Macquarie from the town of Swansea. It consists of a reserve and caravan park along Swansea Channel, and is traversed by the Pacific Highway.

References

External links
 History of Little Pelican (Lake Macquarie City Library)

Suburbs of Lake Macquarie